The 2012 Asian Junior Athletics Championships was the 15th edition of the international athletics competition for Asian under-20 athletes, organised by the Asian Athletics Association. It took place from 9 to 12 June at the Sugathadasa Stadium in Colombo, Sri Lanka – the same venue hosted the 2002 Asian Athletics Championships. Thirty-four nations took part in the event and over five hundred athletes participated. A total of 44 events were contested, with the events being evenly split between the genders.

The Chinese team topped the medal table with fifteen gold medals and a total of 23 medals. Chinese Taipei (Republic of China) had the second greatest number of event wins with six gold medals out of fifteen medals, while Japan had the second greatest haul with a total of 22 medals. India, Thailand and Qatar each won four gold medals and the hosts Sri Lanka won six medals during the four-day competition. Eighteen nations reached the medal table.

Qatar's Ashraf Amgad Elseify gave the stand-out performance of the championships with his Asian junior record in the men's hammer throw. Six other championship records were broken: Chinese pole vaulters Zhang Wei and Xu Huiqin bettered the men's and women's standards, Japan's Haruka Kyuma ran a 5000 m women's record, and Li Ting-Yu representing Chinese Taipei improved the women's steeplechase record. The two other records were set by Hamza Driouch and Teng Haining, who were the top two in the men's middle-distance events – Teng took the 800 metres while Driouch won the 1500 metres. Two athletes completed event doubles: Chen Mudan won both the women's horizontal jumps and Rahul Kumar Pal of India took both the men's long-distance events. Muamer Aissa Barshim of Qatar succeeded his brother, Mutaz Essa Barshim, as the Asian junior high jump champion.

Medal summary

Men

Women

Medal table

Participation

References

External links
Official website (archived)
Results (archived)

Asian Junior Athletics Championships
Asian Junior Championships
Asian Junior Athletics Championships
Sport in Colombo
International athletics competitions hosted by Sri Lanka
Junior Athletics Championships
2012 in youth sport